Timothy Cornell Patterson (born June 24, 1987), known professionally as Mozzy, is an American rapper from Oak Park, Sacramento, California. He is signed with CMG, Interscope Records, Blackmarket Records.

He started rapping in 2004 under the name Lil Tim. He eventually changed his stage name to Mozzy in 2012. He received little attention until the release of his 2015 album Bladadah, which was ranked as the 22nd best rap album of 2015 by Rolling Stone and which gave him the "best run" of 2015 according to Complex Magazine.

Early life
Mozzy grew up on 4th Avenue, in Sacramento's Oak Park neighborhood. His parents were not in his life, so he was raised by his grandmother Brenda Patterson-Usher, a Black Panther party member, who owned several homes throughout Oak Park. Mozzy attended Sacramento High School, but eventually dropped out and earned a GED. He worked various local jobs until he decided to pursue his music career full-time in 2010.

Career
Mozzy first began rapping at age 16  alongside his uncle Genaro "GP the Beast" Patterson.

In 2010 under the stage name "Lil Tim", Mozzy released a single titled "U Ain't Really Like 'Dat", his first release as a full-time musician. On August 2, 2016, he released Lil Timothy N Thingz, a collection of songs recorded in 2008 while he had still been known as "Lil Tim".

Collaborations
Mozzy's first notable collaboration was with an industry executive on his third solo album, Goonbody Embodiment. This collaboration with Oakland rapper Philthy Rich, on the track "I'm Just Being Honest" in early May of 2014, caused a longstanding controversy In December, Compton rapper YG released a single titled "City Mad" featuring Mozzy and associate "Slim 400" leading up to the release of his album, Still Krazy. In 2016, Vallejo rapper Nef the Pharaoh released the album Neffy Got Wings, featuring a track with Mozzy called "Devil's Team".

In 2019, Mozzy released a full length collaboration album called Chop Stixx and Banana Clips, with Gunplay. Writing about the project for Freemusicempire, Dan-O praised the project, stating "Gunplay and Mozzy paint pictures so you can see the crook's whole journey, not just the sentence".

On September 30, 2021, Mozzy was featured on the song "Last One Standing" by Skylar Grey, along with Eminem and Polo G, featured on the soundtrack for the film Venom: Let There Be Carnage.

Solo work
Mozzy's mixtapes, such as Bladadah, are his largest success. He released his first solo mixtape in 2011 under the title Money Means Mozzy, and had released ten other mixtapes by 2016. In 2015, he was recognized by Complex magazine for having the "best run of 2015", and by Rolling Stone for having the 22nd best rap album of 2015.

In 2016, Mozzy moved from Sacramento to Los Angeles, California and released the album Gang Related Siblings, featuring his fellow Oak Park native and producer June. Mozzy's 2016 mixtape Mandatory Check reached no. 7 on the Billboard Rap Albums chart.

In August 2017, Mozzy released his debut studio album, 1 Up Top Ahk. In 2018, his second studio album Gangland Landlord was released, which peaked at number 57 on the US Billboard 200.

On May 1, 2020, he released his fourth studio album, Beyond Bulletproof. The 13-track project follows 2019's Internal Affairs and includes the singles "Pricetag", "Ain't Perfect", "Overcame", and "Big Homie from the Hood". Mozzy enlisted various artists on the album, including King Von, G Herbo, Eric Bellinger, and Polo G. The album debuted at number 43 on the Billboard 200, becoming Mozzy's highest-charting at the time.

On September 23, 2020, Mozzy returned with his second project of 2020, Occupational Hazard. He described it as his favorite project and said the album goes back to his "old" style.

Mozzy started 2021 by releasing the single "Bompton to Oak Park", which was a collaboration with fellow California rapper YG. The single was the lead single to a collaborative album titled Kommunity Service, which was released on May 21 of that year. The album peaked at number 88 on the Billboard 200. In September of that year, Mozzy released his sixth studio album, titled Untreated Trauma. The album debuted at number 19 on the Billboard 200, surpassing Beyond Bulletproof as his highest-charting album. 

On February 10, 2022, Mozzy signed his major-label contract in a joint venture with CMG and Interscope Records and shortly after, released the single "Real Ones" featuring Roddy Ricch.

Controversy
In March 2014, Mozzy released the track "I'm Just Bein Honest" which sparked a feud with local rapper Lavish D. However, there had been an ongoing feud, which started in Meadowview and G Parkway in Sacramento, that put Guttah Team and Starz against Oak Park gangs like Fab and Stunna Gang. This started with an ambush by Lavish D's "Starzup" gang on March 15 on an associate of Mozzy's from Oak Park at the Arden Fair Mall in Sacramento. Nine  shootings followed, which the Sacramento Police department found to be linked by the original incident between the two gangs.

Legal issues
Between 2005 and 2008, Mozzy was arrested three times by the Sacramento Police for possession crimes, including illegal possession of a firearm and evading police. He was arrested again in 2014 and served a sentence in San Quentin State Prison, during which his brother and colleague E Mozzy released the album Free Mozzy. After his release, Mozzy decided to focus solely on his music, releasing four solo albums in 2015. Despite receiving offers to perform across the nation and worldwide, Mozzy was unable to leave the state of California until 2017 due to being on probation.

In July 2018, Mozzy was arrested during a traffic stop in Las Vegas for gun possession.

In July 2022, Mozzy pled guilty to a charge of possession of a firearm by a convicted felon and was sentenced to one year in prison, as well as a $55,000 fine. He is serving his sentence at USP Atwater and is expected to be released in July 2023.

Discography

Studio albums

Compilation albums

Mixtapes and EPs

Collaborative albums

References

External links
 

Rappers from Sacramento, California
Living people
1987 births
American male rappers
Bloods
21st-century American rappers
21st-century American male musicians